Fominoben is an antitussive agent of the benzanilide class, formerly marketed under the name Noleptan. It binds poorly to the sigma-1 receptor, a receptor activated by many other antitussives. It is reported to have respiratory stimulant activity. Other research has indicated it may be an agonist at the benzodiazepine site of the GABAA receptor. It was introduced in Germany in 1973, in Italy in 1979, and in Japan in 1983.

Adverse effects include appetite suppression, nausea, vomiting, insomnia, irritability, and hallucinations. Rarer side effects include somnolence, dizziness, dry mouth, blurred vision, and urticaria.

References 

Antitussives
GABAA receptor positive allosteric modulators
Benzanilides
4-Morpholinyl compunds
Chloroarenes
Tertiary amines